Scopula malagasy is a moth of the family Geometridae. It was described by Viette in 1977. It is endemic to Madagascar.

References

Moths described in 1977
malagasy
Moths of Madagascar
Moths of Africa
Taxa named by Pierre Viette